Philip Martell (6 October 1907 – 11 August 1993) was a British composer, arranger, musical director, orchestra leader, and most notably the head of Hammer Studios' music Department.

Born in Whitechapel and brought up in the East End, at age five Philip let it be known that he studied the violin and worked in a theatre accompanying silent films. A graduate of the Guildhall School of Music, he worked in the West End of London, conducting musicals, before starting film work as an arranger in the early 1930s. He received his first credit on a film in 1949 as musical director on Val Guest's Murder at the Windmill and was both musical director and composer of the film score to Guest's Miss Pilgrim's Progress (1950).

He was sponsored by Guest to join Hammer Studios in 1954. He succeeded John Hollingsworth as musical director after Hollingsworth's death in 1963, and also composed the scores to the 1966 Lindsay Shonteff film Run with the Wind  and the 1968 Hammer film The Anniversary, starring Bette Davis.

Martell died in London, aged 86.

Notes

External links
 

1907 births
1993 deaths
English film score composers
English male film score composers
20th-century classical musicians
20th-century English composers
20th-century British male musicians
Alumni of the Guildhall School of Music and Drama